Soyuz MS-09 was a Soyuz spaceflight which launched on 6 June 2018. It transported three members of the Expedition 56/57 crew to the International Space Station (ISS).  is the 138th flight of a Soyuz spacecraft. The crew consisted of a Russian commander, and an American and a German flight engineer. The mission ended at 05:02 UTC on 20 December 2018.

Crew

Backup crew

Air leak

During the night of 29 August 2018, a small air leak in the ISS was noticed by ground control. A 2 mm hole in the orbital module was discovered, later stated to have been "hidden with a low-quality patch job." Russian crew members used Kapton tape to temporarily seal the leak while a permanent fix was devised. The leak was successfully sealed with the use of a repair kit based on an epoxy sealant, and no further changes in air pressure were noted as of 31 August. On 4 September 2018, it was announced that the hole was created by a drill, but it was unclear if it was accidental or deliberate. Russian officials indicated the hole was some kind of sabotage, perhaps during the module's manufacturing process. Russian officials even speculated that one of the NASA crew members had drilled the hole.

On 11 December 2018, Kononenko and Prokopyev conducted an EVA, cutting into the thermal blankets and pulling away insulation, in order to examine the external hull, take images of the area and retrieve samples of residue to be used in the investigation. As the hole is in the orbital module that is jettisoned before re-entry, the return flight was not endangered. The return of the  crew was briefly delayed by the launch failure of Soyuz MS-10 (until the arrival of the next crew on ).  landed on 20 December at about 05:03 UTC. 

Further reports and investigation were enacted thereafter. Prokopyev was quoted as saying that the drill hole was made from the inside; however, it is still unclear when it was made. In September 2019, the head of Roscosmos Dmitry Rogozin claimed that Roscosmos exactly knows what happened, but that the agency would keep this information secret. On April 20, 2021, a major Russian language tabloid Moskovskij Komsomolets published an article citing a post by Vadim Lukashevich in Facebook who claimed that the hole was drilled by Serena Auñón-Chancellor, which was disputed by NASA and called "preposterous" by Ars Technica.

References

Crewed Soyuz missions
Spacecraft launched in 2018
2018 in Russia
Spacecraft launched by Soyuz-FG rockets
Spacecraft which reentered in 2018
Fully civilian crewed orbital spaceflights